This is a list of characters in anime who either self-identify as lesbian or have been identified by outside parties to be lesbian. Listed characters are either recurring characters, cameos, guest stars, or one-off characters. For the purpose of this article, anime are considered to be any animations created in Japan and do not include any anime-influenced animation from the United States, Europe, other parts of Asia, and elsewhere in the world. Also see the corresponding lists of bisexual and gay anime characters.

The names are organized alphabetically by surname (i.e. last name), or by single name if the character does not have a surname. If more than two characters are in one entry, the last name of the first character is used.

1980s-1990s

In the 2000s

In the 2010s

In the 2020s

See also

 List of yuri works
 List of polyamorous characters in fiction
 List of television series with bisexual characters
 List of animated series with LGBTQ characters
 List of comedy television series with LGBT characters
 List of dramatic television series with LGBT characters: 1970s–2000s
 List of dramatic television series with LGBT characters: 2010s
 List of LGBT characters in television and radio
 list of fictional gay characters
 list of fictional trans characters
 List of fictional bisexual characters
 list of fictional non-binary characters
 list of fictional pansexual characters
 list of fictional asexual characters
 List of fictional intersex characters

References

Lesbian in anime
lesbian

Characters in anime